2004–05 Second League of Serbia and Montenegro (Serbian: Druga liga Srbije i Crne Gore 2004/05) consisted of two groups, Serbia with 20 teams and Montenegro with 10 teams.

League table

Serbia

Montenegro

References

Second League of Serbia and Montenegro
2004–05 in Serbian football
2004–05 in Montenegrin football
Serbia